KUFC may refer to:

Kabul United F.C.
Karachi United Football Club
Kelso United F.C.
Kokushikan University F.C.
Kelantan United F.C.